Gymnopis is a Central American genus of caecilian in the family Dermophiidae.

Species

References
 

 
Amphibian genera
Taxa named by Wilhelm Peters
Taxonomy articles created by Polbot